Brahm may refer to:

 Brahm (surname), a list of people with the surname
 Brahm Bhat, a Hindu caste found in North India
 Brahm Kai Meu (mango), a cultivar of the mango Mangifera indica

See also
 Bram (disambiguation)
 Braham (disambiguation)
 Brahms (disambiguation)
 Brahma (disambiguation)
 Brahman (disambiguation)
 Brahmin (disambiguation)
 Brahmana